Matthew James Doherty (born 16 January 1992) is an Irish professional footballer who plays as a right-back for La Liga club Atlético Madrid and the Republic of Ireland national team.

Doherty was signed by Wolverhampton Wanderers in 2010, who played his Irish club Bohemians during pre-season. He gained senior football experience with loan spells at Hibernian and Bury, before beginning to regularly feature in Wolves' first team. Doherty was a Wolves player for ten years (2010–2020) and made 302 appearances for the club in all competitions. After representing Republic of Ireland U21s, Doherty received his first call-up to the senior Republic of Ireland squad in 2016.

Club career

Wolverhampton Wanderers
Doherty was spotted by Wolverhampton Wanderers while playing for Bohemians in a pre-season game against them in July 2010. Despite never having played a first team game for Bohs, he was invited for a trial and soon signed a two-year deal (with the option of a further year) to move to the English club for a reported £75,000 fee.

The defender made his Wolves debut on 8 January 2011 in an FA Cup tie against Doncaster Rovers, before making his Premier League debut on 24 September 2011 at Liverpool.

In January 2012, Doherty was loaned to Scottish Premier League club Hibernian for the latter part of the 2011–12 season. Here, he played in every defensive position, although his preference was right-back. After making his debut in a 1–0 victory against Kilmarnock on 4 February in the Scottish Cup, he went on to make a total of 17 appearances for the club, in which he scored twice. His final game of the loan spell was the 2012 Scottish Cup Final, against Edinburgh derby rivals Hearts, where Hibs lost 1–5. Doherty later apologised for the team's performance.

In October 2012, Doherty was again loaned out, joining League One club Bury in a three-month deal. Two days later, Doherty made his debut for Bury, in a 0–1 defeat to Swindon Town, in the first of 22 appearances for the club. He established himself in the first team, playing in the right-back position and earning praise from manager Kevin Blackwell. However financial troubles at Bury meant that their loan players, such as Doherty, were sent back to  their parent clubs in January 2013.

With Dean Saunders appointed Wolves manager in January 2013, Doherty was soon promoted to becoming the club's regular right-back and he featured throughout the final months of the 2012–13 season as the team battled unsuccessfully to avoid a second consecutive relegation. Under Saunders' successor, Kenny Jackett, Doherty retained his place in the Wolves' team and, in September 2013, signed a new contract.

Doherty's goal against Fulham at Molineux during the 2015–16 campaign was awarded the club's best goal of the season. On 26 September 2017, he signed a new contract keeping him at Wolves until the summer of 2021. Towards the end of the 2017–18 campaign, Wolves were promoted back to the Premier League after a six-year absence.

Doherty scored his first Premier League goal for Wolves (on his ninth appearance in the Premier League) on 6 October 2018 at Crystal Palace as the team won 1–0. Two days later it was announced that Doherty had won the Professional Footballers' Association Fans' Premier League Player of the Month award for September 2018, becoming only the fourth Ireland player to win this award in the history of the Premier League.

Doherty scored his second Premier League goal for Wolves on his 200th league appearance for the club on 30 November 2018 at Cardiff City in a 2–1 defeat. The following 15 February, he signed a new contract that would keep him at the club until the summer of 2023.

Doherty scored his fourth Premier League goal, and his first Premier League goal to be scored at Molineux, in a 3–1 win over Arsenal, Wolves's first win against Arsenal since 1979, on 24 April 2019. That 8 August, he scored the team's first goal in a 4–0 win on his debut appearance in European competition in the UEFA Europa League Qualifying Third Round, 1st Leg, against FC Pyunik in Yerevan, Armenia.

Writing in The Guardian in December 2019, Paul Doyle declared Doherty Wolves' best player of the decade. He marked his 300th appearance for the club (in all competitions) in their last league game of the 2019–20 season away to Chelsea on 26 July 2020. The 302nd and final appearance of his ten-year spell, was in the 2019–20 UEFA Europa League quarter-final against Sevilla on 11 August.

Tottenham Hotspur
On 30 August 2020, Doherty was sold to Tottenham Hotspur for £13.4 million with no add-ons and signed on a four-year deal . As a life-long Arsenal fan, Doherty had expressed his love of Tottenham's local rivals on social media, and on signing for Tottenham the player and club made a light-hearted video about the deletion of these historic comments. He made his debut on 13 September in a 1–0 home defeat by Everton.

Doherty battled for his right-back place against Serge Aurier. On 2 January 2021, he was sent off at the end of a 3–0 home win over Leeds United.
On 26 February 2022, Doherty scored his first goal for Tottenham in a Premier League clash against Leeds United at Elland Road.
Tottenham eventually won the game 4–0 in which Son Heung-min and Harry Kane also became the Premier League's deadliest partnership in terms of goals and assists for each other. On 9 April 2022, Doherty suffered a medial collateral ligament injury in a win over Aston Villa that kept him out of action for the rest of the season.

Doherty scored his first goal of the 2022-23 season — his third for the club — in Spurs’ 4-0 win over Crystal Palace at Selhurst Park on 4 January 2023.

Atlético Madrid 
On 31 January 2023, Spurs terminated  Doherty's contract so he could join La Liga side Atlético Madrid.

International career
Doherty played for the Republic of Ireland national under-19 football team. In May 2012, he was put on standby for the under-21s.

Doherty received his first call-up to the senior Republic of Ireland squad on 11 March 2016, for Ireland's friendlies against Switzerland and Slovakia. He made his senior debut on 23 March 2018, in a 1–0 defeat to Turkey, coming on as a substitute for captain Séamus Coleman. He featured in an Ireland starting XI for the first time in the Republic's UEFA Nations League match with Denmark in Dublin on 13 October 2018, just days after becoming only the fourth Republic of Ireland player in the history of the Premier League to win the Professional Footballers' Association Fans' Premier League Player of the Month award.

On 16 November 2020, the Football Association of Ireland announced that Doherty had tested positive for COVID-19 after playing a full game against Wales at the Cardiff City Stadium. The announcement also included James McClean's positive result.

Doherty was also eligible to play for the Netherlands as his mother is Dutch.

Career statistics

Club

International

Scores and results list the Republic of Ireland's goal tally first.

Honours

Hibernian
Scottish Cup runner-up: 2011–12

Wolverhampton Wanderers
EFL Championship: 2017–18
Football League One: 2013–14

Tottenham Hotspur
EFL Cup runner-up: 2020–21

Individual
Wolverhampton Wanderers Player of the Year: 2015–16
Professional Footballers' Association Fans' Premier League Player of the Month: September 2018

References

External links

Profile at the Atlético Madrid website

1992 births
Living people
Association footballers from Dublin (city)
Republic of Ireland youth international footballers
Republic of Ireland under-21 international footballers
Republic of Ireland association footballers
Republic of Ireland international footballers
Association football defenders
Home Farm F.C. players
Belvedere F.C. players
Bohemian F.C. players
Wolverhampton Wanderers F.C. players
Hibernian F.C. players
Bury F.C. players
Tottenham Hotspur F.C. players
Premier League players
Scottish Premier League players
English Football League players
Irish people of Dutch descent
Republic of Ireland expatriate association footballers
Expatriate footballers in England
Irish expatriate sportspeople in England
Expatriate footballers in Spain
Irish expatriate sportspeople in Spain
Atlético Madrid footballers